Burford is a town in Oxfordshire, England.

Burford  may also refer to:

Places
Burford, Cheshire, England
Burford, Devon, England
Burford, Ontario, Canada
Burford, Shropshire, England
Burford, Somerset, England

Other uses
Burford (surname)
HMS Burford, the name of three ships of the Royal Navy
Burford Capital, known simply as Burford, a litigation finance company

See also
Bruford (disambiguation)
Buford (disambiguation)
Ford (disambiguation)